Oladayo A. Okeniyi (born June 14, 1988) is a Nigerian-American actor, popularly known for playing the role of Thresh in The Hunger Games and Danny Dyson in Terminator Genisys.

Life and career
Dayo was born in Jos and grew up in Lagos, Nigeria, and has four siblings. His father is a retired customs officer from Nigeria, and his mother is a literature teacher from Kenya.
In 2003, he moved with his family to Indiana, United States, from Nigeria and later moved to California. He earned a bachelor's degree in visual communications at Anderson University (Indiana) in 2009.

Prior to being cast in The Hunger Games, Okeniyi worked in local theatre and in film shorts. Okeniyi starred 2014 in the drama film Endless Love, also portrayed Danny Dyson in the 2015 film Terminator Genisys and starred in the NBC series Shades of Blue. Okeniyi is set to appear in the film Fresh, which is scheduled to screen at the 2022 Sundance Film Festival.

Filmography

Film

Television

Awards

Won
2013 Nigeria Entertainment Awards – Best International Actor

Nominated
2021 52nd NAACP Image Awards - Outstanding Breakthrough Performance in a Motion Picture

References

External links
 
 

1988 births
21st-century American male actors
American male film actors
American people of Kenyan descent
American people of Yoruba descent
Anderson University (Indiana) alumni
Living people
Male actors from California
Male actors from Indiana
Male actors from Lagos
Nigerian emigrants to the United States
Nigerian people of Kenyan descent
Yoruba male actors